Grensdalur is a volcano in Iceland. The elevation is about 497 m (1631 ft). Its position is 64.02°N 21.17°W.
It was active during Pleistocene.

References

External links
 

Volcanoes of Iceland
Pleistocene stratovolcanoes